Theres Abbey was a Benedictine monastery in the village of Theres in the district of Hassberge, in Franconia in the north of Bavaria, Germany.

History
The monastery, dedicated to Saint Stephen and Saint Vitus, was founded in about 1045 by Bishop Suidger of Bamberg. It was dissolved in 1802 during the secularisation of Bavaria.

Buildings
The abbey buildings were acquired in 1804 by Theodor von Kretschmann, a government minister of Saxe-Coburg. The church was demolished in 1809. The remaining buildings were converted into a country house.

References

Benedictine monasteries in Germany
Monasteries in Bavaria
1040s establishments in the Holy Roman Empire
Christian monasteries established in the 11th century
1802 disestablishments in the Holy Roman Empire
Haßberge (district)